Aiselukharka is a rural municipality (gaunpalika) out of eight rural municipality located in Khotang District of Province No. 1 of Nepal. There are a total of 10 municipalities in Khotang in which 2 are urban and 8 are rural.

Ainselu Kharka, Ribdung Jaleshwari, Jyamire, Bakachol, Ribdung Maheshwari, Magpa and Rakha Bangdel which previously were all separate Village development committee merged to form this new local level body. Fulfilling the requirement of the new Constitution of Nepal 2015, Ministry of Federal Affairs and Local Development replaced all old VDCs and Municipalities into 753 new local level body (Municipality).

The rural municipality is divided into total 7 wards and the headquarter of this newly formed rural municipality is situated in Ainselu Kharka.

References

External links
 Official website
 Final District 1-75 Corrected Last for RAJPATRA

Rural municipalities in Koshi Province
Populated places in Khotang District
Rural municipalities of Nepal established in 2017
Rural municipalities in Khotang District